The R812 road, or Davitt Road, is a regional road in Dublin, Ireland.

The official definition of the R812 from the Roads Act 1993 (Classification of Regional Roads) Order 2006  states:

R812: Davitt Road, Dublin

Between its junction with R810 at Tyrconnell Road and its junction with R111 at Dolphin Road via Davitt Road all in the city of Dublin.

See also
Roads in Ireland
National primary road
National secondary road
Regional road

References

Regional roads in the Republic of Ireland
Roads in County Dublin